Yang Hye-ji (born 20 January 1996) is South Korean actress. She is best known for her roles in dramas such as Live On, Nevertheless, When the Weather Is Fine, and The Rich Son.

Early life and education
She is also related to actor Ahn Nae-sang, her uncle from the maternal side of the family.

Filmography

Television series

Film

Music video

Awards and nominations

References

External links
 
 

1996 births
Living people
21st-century South Korean actresses
South Korean television actresses
South Korean film actresses
South Korean web series actresses